Peng Yu (born 26 January 1934), is a Chinese actress. She is known for the TV comedy A Family in Dongbei. She was awarded the Golden Rooster Award for Best Supporting Actress in 2001 for her acting in The Full Moon.

Selected filmography

Film

Television Series

References

External links

1934 births
Living people
Chinese film actresses
Chinese television actresses
Actresses from Harbin
20th-century Chinese actresses
21st-century Chinese actresses